The discography of Shihad, a New Zealand rock band, consists of ten studio albums, one live album, one compilation album, eight EPs, 36 singles and 40 music videos.

Shihad's first release was the Devolve EP, released in 1990. Its most recent release is the 2021 album Old Gods. Their discography includes two albums, one EP and four singles from the period of 2002 to 2003 that were released under the name band Pacifier. Shihad received music video funding grants from broadcast funding agency NZ On Air for 31 music videos, the most any New Zealand artist has had funded.

Albums

Studio albums

Live albums

Compilation albums

EPs

Singles

Notes

Music videos

References

External links 

 Shihad Wiki - discography
 Shihad Wiki - videography

Discographies of New Zealand artists
Rock music group discographies
Discography